Anita Kulcsár (2 October 1976 – 19 January 2005) was a Hungarian handball player. She was voted IHF World Player of the Year in 2004 by the International Handball Federation.

Life 
She began her handball career with Nyíregyházi Kölcsey and later played for Győri Audi ETO KC, Cornexi-Alcoa and Dunaferr NK.

She died in a car accident on 19 January 2005, at the age of 28; according to the police report, she was driving from Sukoró to Dunaújváros for team practice when her car slid off the road and hit a tree. Since her death, the city of Dunaújváros organizes the Anita Kulcsár Memorial Tournament in her honor every year.

Achievements 
Nemzeti Bajnokság I:
Winner: 2004
Silver Medalist: 1998, 2000
Bronze Medalist: 1999, 2001
Magyar Kupa:
Winner: 2004
Silver Medalist: 2000
EHF Cup:
Finalist: 1999
Olympic Games:
Silver Medalist: 2000
European Championship:
Winner: 2000
Bronze Medalist: 1998, 2004
World Championship:
Silver Medalist: 2003

Awards and recognition
 IHF World Player of the Year: 2004

References

External links
 Anita Kulcsár at WorldHandball.com
 Anita Kulcsár at Handball.hu 
 
 
 

1976 births
2005 deaths
Hungarian female handball players
Olympic handball players of Hungary
Olympic medalists in handball
Olympic silver medalists for Hungary
Handball players at the 2004 Summer Olympics
Handball players at the 2000 Summer Olympics
Medalists at the 2000 Summer Olympics
Road incident deaths in Hungary
Győri Audi ETO KC players
Fehérvár KC players
People from Szerencs
Sportspeople from Borsod-Abaúj-Zemplén County